Judith LeClair (born 1958), from Newark, Delaware, is an American bassoonist.

She has been the principal bassoon in the New York Philharmonic since 1981 and on the faculty at the Juilliard School since 1985. LeClair began studying the instrument at age 11 and began her professional career at the age of 15 in a performance with the Philadelphia Orchestra playing the Mozart Sinfonia Concertante with colleagues from the Settlement Music School in Philadelphia, where she studied with Shirley Curtiss. She studied bassoon with K. David van Hoesen at the Eastman School of Music and held the principal chair in the San Diego Symphony and San Diego Opera for two seasons after her graduation in 1979 before winning her position with New York.

John Williams' bassoon concerto, The Five Sacred Trees, was written for LeClair and her "unparalleled artistry." She premiered it in April 1995 as part of the New York Philharmonic's 150th anniversary festivities after having chosen him to receive the commission for the piece. She currently plays a 1937 Heckel bassoon. Her first teacher, an older student, owned the professional-level instrument; after he died in an accident at the age of 19, LeClair's parents bought the instrument from the boy's family. It remains her only instrument.

In addition to her orchestral career, LeClair is also an active chamber musician and has taught numerous masterclasses. She is married to pianist Jonathan Feldman, who is the former head of the collaborative piano department at Juilliard, where he currently teaches. She gave birth to son Gabriel at age 41. They currently live in Haworth, New Jersey.

Selected discography
New York Legends (Cala Records, 1997)
The Five Sacred Trees (Sony Classical, 1997)
First Chairs: Cantos for Solo Instruments, "Canto XII" (Albany Records, 1998)

References

External links
New York Philharmonic: Judith LeClair
Live From Lincoln Center - Interview with Judith Leclair
Bassoonist Judy LeClair: 'A family was my answer'
Judith LeClair premieres John Williams' bassoon concerto with the New York Philharmonic

1958 births
Living people
American classical bassoonists
Juilliard School faculty
Musicians from Delaware
People from Haworth, New Jersey
People from Newark, Delaware
Educators from New Jersey
American women educators
Classical musicians from New York (state)
Classical musicians from New Jersey
21st-century American women